Kenneth E. Lehmann (born January 13, 1942) is a former linebacker for the Ottawa Rough Riders and BC Lions of the Canadian Football League from 1964 to 1972.

College
Lehmann graduated with an Economics degree from Xavier University in Cincinnati, Ohio.

Ottawa
Lehmann played middle linebacker for the Ottawa Rough Riders from 1964 to 1971.

In 1965, Lehmann won the Hiram Walker Trophy and was selected to the Eastern Football Conference All Star Team. Lehmann was chosen as an Eastern All-Star five times throughout his career and All-Canadian four times. In 1966, Lehmann was the Eastern finalist for the Schenleys Most Outstanding Linemen Award and subsequently won the award in 1968. In 1968, Lehmann was named CFL Lineman of the Year.  He remains tied for the CFL record for the most blocked punts by a player in a game with 2.

Post-football honors
Lehmann was inducted into the Canadian Football Hall of Fame in 2011. The city of Ottawa declared Sunday, October 23, 2011, Ken Lehmann day to honour Ken's contribution to football in Ottawa.

Video clips

References

1942 births
Living people
American players of Canadian football
BC Lions players
Canadian Football Hall of Fame inductees
Canadian football linebackers
Ottawa Rough Riders players
Players of American football from Louisville, Kentucky
Players of Canadian football from Louisville, Kentucky
Xavier Musketeers football players